The R621 is a Regional Route in South Africa.

Route
Its north-western terminus is the N11 between Ladysmith and Newcastle, KwaZulu-Natal. It initially heads east, to Dannhauser. Leaving the town, it heads south-east, and passes through Hattingspruit before ending at an intersection with the R68 just north of Dundee.

References

Regional Routes in KwaZulu-Natal